Frédéric Caudron (born 27 January 1968 in Mons, Belgium)  is a Belgian professional three-cushion billiards player, nicknamed "L'Extraterrestre" ("The Extraterrestrial"). He won the UMB World Three-cushion Championship in 1999 and 2013. He also won the Sang Lee International Open two consecutive times (2006 and 2007), the CEB European Championship twice (2002 and 2006), as well as 53 Belgian national titles. His highest  three cushions run is 28 (15/04/13 Brandenburg, GERMANY) and his best game average is 6.666 (40 points in 6 innings).

References

External links

 Caudron's official site
 Frederic Caudron vs. Javier Palazon in SuperFinal Barcelona
 Frederic Caudron in World National Team Championship - Viersen 2017

Belgian carom billiards players
World champions in three-cushion billiards
World Cup champions in three-cushion billiards
1968 births
Living people
Walloon people
Competitors at the 2005 World Games
Sportspeople from Mons